My Life for Maria Isabella (German: Mein Leben für Maria Isabell) is a 1935 German drama film directed by Erich Waschneck and starring Viktor de Kowa, Maria Andergast and Peter Voß. It is a military drama, the Maria Isabella of the title being the name of a regiment. Heavy cuts were imposed by the censors because of fears the film's mutiny scenes were too attractively portrayed. Critics were not impressed by the casting of Viktor de Kowa, known for his light musical comedy roles, as the film's hero.

It was shot at the Johannisthal Studios in Berlin. The film's sets were designed by the art directors Otto Erdmann and Hans Sohnle. It was distributed by the Tobis subsidiary Rota-Film.

Synopsis
In Belgrade during the closing days of the First World War, the Austrian regiments are mostly composed of disgruntled minorities who mutiny rather than fight on. A young officer attempts to save the regimental colours from falling into enemy hands, and safely takes them back to Vienna where they are symbolically burnt.

Cast
 Viktor de Kowa as Fähnrich Menis 
 Maria Andergast as Resa Lang 
 Peter Voß as Rittmeister Graf Bottenlauben 
 Franz Pfaudler as Diener Anton 
 Hans-Joachim Büttner
 Hermann Frick
 Julia Serda
 Karin Evans
 Bernhard Minetti as Rittmeister von Hackenberg 
 Ernst Karchow
 Harry Hardt as Oberstleutnant 
 Ekkehard Arendt
 Hans Junkermann as Stadtkommandant von Belgrad 
 Hans Zesch-Ballot as Major Sumerset 
 Veit Harlan as Meuternder Korporal 
 Anton Pointner
 Hugo Flink
 Albert von Kersten
 Gerhard Haselbach
 Albert Hugelmann
 Erich Fiedler as Lakai im Konak

See also
The Standard (1977)

References

Bibliography 
 Noack, Frank. Veit Harlan: The Life and Work of a Nazi Filmmaker. University Press of Kentucky, 2016.
 Waldman, Harry. Nazi Films in America, 1933–1942. McFarland, 2008.

External links 
 

1935 films
1935 war films
German war drama films
German World War I films
Films of Nazi Germany
1930s German-language films
Films directed by Erich Waschneck
Films based on Austrian novels
Tobis Film films
Films set in Belgrade
Films set in Vienna
Films set in 1918
1935 drama films
1930s German films
Films shot at Johannisthal Studios